Valanjiyapatti also known as Vadugapatti, is a panchayat town in Erode district in the Indian state of Tamil Nadu.

The famous Rajendran Matric Higher Secondary School, in Vadugapatti, is located on Arachalur to/fro Thamaraipalayam road in between Arachalur and Vilakkethi road junction.

Demographics
 India census, Vadugapatti had a population of 10,919. Males constitute 50% of the population and females 50%. Vadugapatti has an average literacy rate of 58%, lower than the national average of 59.5%: male literacy is 66%, and female literacy is 49%. In Vadugapatti, 8% of the population is under 6 years of age.

References

Cities and towns in Erode district